The 2019 CME Group Tour Championship was the ninth CME Group Tour Championship, a women's professional golf tournament and the season-ending event on the U.S.-based LPGA Tour. It was played at the Gold Course of Tiburón Golf Club in Naples, Florida. The CME Group Tour Championship marked the end of the season-long "Race to the CME Globe" in 2019. The event was televised by Golf Channel Thursday through Saturday on a 3-hour delay, and NBC Sunday live.

Kim Sei-young won by one stroke over Charley Hull.

Format

Qualification
Since 2014, the field has determined by a season-long points race, the "Race to the CME Globe". All players making the cut in a tournament earned points, with 500 points going to the winner. The five major championships had a higher points distribution, with 625 points to the winner. No-cut tournaments only awarded points to the top 40 finishers. Only LPGA members are eligible to earn points. From 2014 to 2018, the top 72 players on the points list and any tournament winners, whether or not a member, earned entry into the championship. The points were reset for the championship and the points leader after the championship won a $1 million bonus. Only the top-12 players entering the tournament has a mathematical chance of winning the bonus.

For 2019, the top 60 players on the "Race to the CME Globe" points list gained entry into the championship. Tournament winners were no longer given automatic entry into the championship. The bonus is now rolled into the purse so that the winner of the tournament wins $1.5 million. All 60 players compete for the top prize.

Field
Top 60 LPGA members and those tied for 60th on the "Race to the CME Globe" Points Standings

Marina Alex, Brittany Altomare, Céline Boutier, Nicole Broch Larsen, Ashleigh Buhai, Chella Choi, Carlota Ciganda, Jodi Ewart Shadoff, Shanshan Feng, Kristen Gillman, Hannah Green, Jaye Marie Green, Georgia Hall, Nasa Hataoka, Brooke Henderson, Wei-Ling Hsu, Charley Hull, M. J. Hur, Ji Eun-hee, Ariya Jutanugarn, Moriya Jutanugarn, Danielle Kang, Megan Khang, Kim Hyo-joo, Kim Sei-young, Katherine Kirk, Cheyenne Knight, Ko Jin-young, Lydia Ko, Jessica Korda, Nelly Korda, Jennifer Kupcho, Bronte Law, Lee Jeong-eun, Lee Mi-hyang, Minjee Lee, Mirim Lee, Stacy Lewis, Yu Liu, Gaby López, Nanna Koerstz Madsen, Caroline Masson, Ally McDonald, Azahara Muñoz, Anna Nordqvist, Su-Hyun Oh, Amy Olson, Annie Park, Inbee Park, Park Sung-hyun, Morgan Pressel, Ryu So-yeon, Lizette Salas, Alena Sharp, Jenny Shin, Jasmine Suwannapura, Lexi Thompson, Jing Yan, Amy Yang, Angel Yin

Nationalities in the field

Final leaderboard
Sunday, November 24, 2019

References

External links

Coverage on LPGA Tour's official site

2019 CME Group Tour Championship
2019 CME Group Tour Championship
2019 in women's golf
2019 in American women's sports
2019 in sports in Florida
November 2019 sports events in the United States